The 1888–89 New Zealand Native football team played 107 rugby union matches during their 14-month tour of the British Isles, Australia, and New Zealand. The tour was the longest in rugby history, and the first by a New Zealand team to Europe. The team was privately organised by Joe Warbrick, and was originally intended to contain only Māori players. Several non-Māori and a number of non-New Zealand-born players were eventually recruited to strengthen the side. Of their rugby matches, they won 78, lost 23, and drew 6. The team played three internationals: a heavy loss to England, a win over Ireland, and a narrow loss to Wales.

The initial leg of the Native team's journey was a tour of New Zealand, and their first match was a 5–0 victory over Hawke's Bay. The team departed from New Zealand having won seven of their nine matches, but their losses included a heavy defeat to Auckland. After stopping in Melbourne on their way to London, they played their first match in England against Surrey on 3 October 1888. The team played 74 matches in the British Isles—with 36 of these in their first three months. Only one match was played in Scotland, against Hawick RFC, and three in Ireland. The intense itinerary of matches continued during the second half of their British Isles leg; this contributed to a high injury rate, and the team struggled to field a full side during much of this time. Despite the injury toll, they won 14 of their last 20 matches in England. While in the British Isles the Natives averaged a game every 2.3 days.

Following their departure from Plymouth in March 1889, the Natives travelled to Melbourne, Australia. There the team played eight Australian rules football (then known as Victorian rules) matches and two rugby games. The team continued their journey to New South Wales and Queensland, where they played mostly rugby. This included playing each state side twice, as well as at least two association football matches. The final leg of the team's trip was another tour of New Zealand—this saw them lose only once, to Auckland in their final game.

Matches played 

Notes on scoring:
 For the rugby matches in the British Isles, Victoria, and New Zealand tries scored one point, conversions two points, and penalties and drop goals three points.
 For the rugby matches in New South Wales tries scored three points, conversions two points, and drop goals four points.
 For the rugby matches in Queensland tries scored two points, conversions three points, and drop goals four points.
 For Victorian Rules matches the numbers in brackets under points scored states the goals, then behinds (goals/behinds).
 For Victorian Rules matches the number before the brackets is the score calculated with goals worth six points, and behinds one.

Notes on matches:
 The match record for the British Isles is considered complete, however the match record of the Victorian Rules and Association football matches in the Australian leg of the tour is a matter of some debate. The list of Victorian Rules matches was compiled by historian Greg Ryan and relied heavily on coverage of the matches in the Melbourne press. The frequency of matches suggests the list is complete.

Notes on opposition:
 As the tour occurred before the 1895 schism of rugby football—where many northern English rugby clubs left the Rugby Football Union to form the Northern Union—many of the team's opponents in the British Isles later elected to play rugby league rather than rugby union. The links in the tables below link to those clubs regardless of what code they subsequently played.
 At least one club, Manningham F.C., has since converted to association football.

Summary

New Zealand and Victoria 

Source:

British Isles 

Source:

Australia 

Source:

New Zealand 

Source:

Victorian Rules in Australia 

Source:

Association football in Australia 

Source:

Notes

References

Sources 

 
 
 
 
 
 
 

Māori All Blacks
New Zealand Native
New Zealand Native
Rugby union tours of New Zealand
Rugby union tours of Australia
Rugby union tours of England
Rugby union tours of Ireland
Rugby union tours of Scotland
Rugby union tours of Wales
1888 in New Zealand rugby union
1889 in New Zealand rugby union
1888 in Australian rugby union
1889 in Australian rugby union
New Zealand Native
New Zealand Native
New Zealand Native
Natives